The Wright Company was the commercial aviation business venture of the Wright Brothers, established by them on November 22, 1909, in conjunction with several prominent industrialists from New York and Detroit with the intention of capitalizing on their invention of the practical airplane. The company maintained its headquarters office in New York City and built its factory in Dayton, Ohio.

History 
The two buildings designed by Dayton architect William Earl Russ and built by Rouzer Construction for the Wright Company in Dayton in 1910 and 1911 were the first in the United States constructed specifically for an airplane factory and were included within the boundary of Dayton Aviation Heritage National Historical Park in 2009.

The Wright Company concentrated its efforts on protecting the company's patent rights rather than on developing new aircraft or aircraft components, believing that innovations would hurt the company's efforts to obtain royalties from competing manufacturers or patent infringers. Wilbur Wright died in 1912, and on October 15, 1915, Orville Wright sold the company, which in 1916 merged with the Glenn L. Martin Company to form the Wright-Martin Company.   Orville Wright, who had purchased 97% of the outstanding company stock in 1914 as he prepared to leave the business world, estimated that the Wright Company built approximately 120 airplanes across all of its different models between 1910 and 1915.

Many of the papers of the Wright Company are now in the collection of the Museum of Flight in Seattle, while others are held by the Library of Congress in Washington, D.C. The Library of Congress also holds the papers of Grover Loening, the second Wright Company factory manager, while the papers of Frank Henry Russell, the first plant manager, are at the University of Wyoming's American Heritage Center.

Products

Aircraft

Engines 
 Wright Vertical 4

References

Notes

External links

Defunct aircraft manufacturers of the United States
Wright brothers
.
Defunct aircraft engine manufacturers of the United States
Defunct companies based in Dayton, Ohio
Manufacturing companies based in Ohio
American companies established in 1918
Vehicle manufacturing companies established in 1918
Manufacturing companies disestablished in 1926
1909 establishments in New York (state)
1909 establishments in Ohio
1916 disestablishments in New York (state)
1910s disestablishments in Ohio
Defunct manufacturing companies based in New York City